Maryam Alqatan (born June 28, 1969), better known as Shemayel, is a retired Kuwaiti singer and actress. She started a singing and acting career in 1998 which continued until 2003, when she became an Islamic preacher.

Discography
 Ya Athabi (English: My Suffering) (1998, alnibras/alkhyol)
 Kaser alzejaj (English: Broke The Glass) (1999, alnibras/alkheyol)
 Katheb o sadeg (English: Lies and Truth) (2000, Rotana)
 Mahad tharbkom ala edekom (English: Nobody Hit Your Hand) (2003, Rotana); Unreleased

References

Kuwaiti women singers
Living people
Rotana Records artists
1969 births